Josip Juraj Strossmayer, also Štrosmajer (4 February 1815 – 8 April 1905) was a Croatian politician, Roman Catholic bishop, and benefactor.

Early life and rise as a cleric

Strossmayer was born in Osijek to a Croatian family. His great-grandfather was an ethnic German immigrant from Styria who had married a Croatian woman. He finished school at a gymnasium in Osijek, and then graduated theology at the Catholic seminary in Đakovo. He earned a PhD in philosophy at a high seminary in Budapest, at the age of 20.

In 1838 he worked as a vicar in Petrovaradin, before moving to Vienna in 1840 to the Augustineum and the University of Vienna, where he received another doctorate in philosophy and Canon law in 1842. In 1847 he was made the Habsburg palace chaplain (a position he would hold until 1859), and named one of the rectors of the Augustineum.

Cultural policy

Strossmayer was instrumental in the founding of the Yugoslav Academy of Sciences and Arts in 1866, as well as the re-establishment of the University of Zagreb in 1874. He initiated the building of the Academy Palace (completed in 1880) and set up The Strossmayer Gallery of Old Masters (1884) in Zagreb.

Strossmayer aided the creation of the printing house in Cetinje, helped found the Matica slovenska and actively supported Matica srpska, the national culture societies of the Slovenes and the Serbs, respectively.

Catholic diplomacy
At the Vatican Council he was one of the most notable opponents of papal infallibility, and distinguished himself as a speaker. The pope praised Strossmayer's "remarkably good Latin." A speech in which he defended Protestantism made a great sensation. Another speech, delivered on 2 June 1870 is attributed to him. The speech was forged by a former Augustinian, a Mexican named José Agustín de Escudero. It is full of heresies and denies not only infallibility but also the primacy of the pope. On 26 December 1872, he published the decrees of the council in his official paper. He later proclaimed his submission to the pope, as in his pastoral letter of 28 February 1881, on Sts. Cyril and Methodius, expressing his devotion to the papal see at times in extravagant language.

Personal life

Since the early days of his episcopate, he was a close friend of Franjo Rački, the most renowned Croatian historian of his time. When the Academy was founded in 1867, Strossmayer was named chief sponsor, and Rački its President. In 1894, when Rački died, Strossmayer wrote: "I lost my dearest friend... I lost a part of myself... the good half of everything I have created was his thought, his credit and his glory". Their friendship was well documented in a series of four books containing their letters, compiled by historian Ferdo Šišić.

Legacy

Bishop Nikolaj Velimirović dedicated a booklet entitled Religion and Nationality in Serbia to Strossmayer: “to the memory of the great Croatian patriot Bishop Strossmayer on the centenary of his birth (1815–1915)".

In 1881, Schulzer (a Hungarian-Croatian army officer and mycologist) published a genus of fungi in the family Helotiaceae as Strossmayeria which was named in Strossmayer's honour.

References

Further reading
 
  Speech attributed to Strossmayer. Its authenticity is disputed.

External links 

1815 births
1905 deaths
People from Osijek
Higher Scientific Institute for Diocesan Priests at St. Augustine's alumni
19th-century Croatian Roman Catholic priests
19th-century Roman Catholic bishops in Austria-Hungary
People of the Illyrian movement
Croatian politicians
People from Đakovo
Diplomats of the Holy See
Croatian people of Austrian descent
Croatian people of German descent
Members of the Serbian Academy of Sciences and Arts
Members of the Bulgarian Academy of Sciences
Yugoslavism